The United States District Court for the Southern District of West Virginia (in case citations, S.D. W. Va.) is a federal court in the Fourth Circuit (except for patent claims and claims against the U.S. government under the Tucker Act, which are appealed to the Federal Circuit).

The District was established on June 22, 1901.

, the United States Attorney for the District is William S. Thompson.

Organization of the court 

The United States District Court for the Southern District of West Virginia is one of two federal judicial districts in West Virginia. Court for the Southern District is held at Beckley, Bluefield, Charleston, and Huntington.

Beckley Division comprises the following counties: Greenbrier, Raleigh, Summers, and Wyoming.

Bluefield Division comprises the following counties: Mercer, McDowell, and Monroe.

Charleston Division comprises the following counties: Boone, Clay, Fayette, Jackson, Kanawha, Lincoln, Logan, Mingo, Nicholas, Roane, Wirt, and Wood.

Huntington Division comprises the following counties: Cabell, Mason, Putnam, and Wayne.

Current judges 
:

Former judges

Chief judges

Succession of seats

See also 
 Courts of West Virginia
 List of current United States district judges
 List of United States federal courthouses in West Virginia

References

External links 
 U.S. District Court for the Southern District of West Virginia
 The United States Attorney's Office Southern District of West Virginia

West Virginia, Southern District
West Virginia law
Beckley, West Virginia
Charleston, West Virginia
Huntington, West Virginia
1901 establishments in West Virginia
Mercer County, West Virginia
Courthouses in West Virginia
Courts and tribunals established in 1901